Jeans Team are a Berlin-based electronic music group. The group was founded by Franz Schütte and Reimo Herfort 1995 in the borough of Wedding and started as a duo as a video art performance group. Various members of the ensemble perform DJ sets, particularly in Berlin.

Discography

References

External links
 Official Site

German electronic music groups
Kitty-Yo artists
Musical groups established in 1995
1995 establishments in Germany